The Kaoham Shuttle is a Lillooet–Seton Portage passenger rail service along the northern shore of Seton Lake in the Squamish-Lillooet region of southwestern British Columbia.

Earlier railway shuttles
This was not the case for gas car no. 107, bought in 1949, but built in 1926. In 1958, the western terminus moved to Seton Portage. The railbus hauled one or two trailers loaded with automobiles and trucks on a twice daily return service. The completion of access roads and the introduction of new Budd Rail Diesel Cars on the BC Rail daily intercity service in the late 1950s prompted the end of this shuttle in 1961.

In 1979, a Seton Portage–Lillooet morning school shuttle commenced. The cost was shared equally between the 
Lillooet School District, Seton Lake First Nation, and BC Hydro (which operates the Shalalth powerhouses). The high school pupils named the single passenger car behind the locomotive as the "Budd Wiser". Students returned home on the southbound intercity passenger train.

Shalalth Tunnel
The tunnel lies immediately west of Shalalth. The initial  tunnel, behind the “Bridge River 2 Generating Station” building, was timber lined and opened in 1915. The second  tunnel, built in the mid-1950s, resulted from a line relocation to accommodate the hydro building construction. The new trackage emerged from the tunnel directly in line with the old turntable, which was removed at this time. The third  tunnel, opened in 1989, was a relocation to bypass a dangerous rock slide area. The increased height clearance was to accommodate any future electrification of this section of the line.

Kaoham installation
In the St’at’imc language, the word "Kaoham" means "to meet the train".

In November 2002, BC Rail ended all passenger service between North Vancouver and Prince George. In 2001, the railway purchased a pair of gasoline-powered railbus units from Jim Busby Services in California, who had rebuilt the Fairmont A8 speeders. West Coach International of California carried out further modifications, with the work completed by BC Rail upon arrival in Lillooet. After the inaugural run on October 31, 2002, regular operation started the next day. "Budd-Lites" was soon their nickname. These units were initially numbered TU-108 and TU-109 by BC Rail to maintain the gas car numbering sequence but later renumbered to 10800 and 10900 by Canadian National Railway (CN) after acquiring BC Rail.

Kaoham operation

If the duplicate rear car is attached, only the lead car motor is used. Each car contains 20 school-bus type seats for the bumpy journey. This enterprise on the CN Squamish Subdivision is a partnership between CN and the Seton Lake First Nation. The former provides the driver and train. The latter handles bookings and ticketing. The service primarily exists for the isolated residents (mainly First Nations) of Seton Portage and Shalalth to reach Lillooet for school, shopping, or medical needs. Consequently, most days, the train departs Seton Portage in the morning and returns in the afternoon. On Fridays, two round trips occur. When the train arrives, the crew briefly open the Lillooet station waiting area. Being CN's only non-freight operation, passengers on the shuttle are classified as "groceries" for cargo reporting purposes.

Although bookings are encouraged, uncertainty exists as to whether the bookings have been recorded. Where recorded, a high ranking on the list is no guarantee of being able to purchase a ticket. Tour parties have been known to push in front to secure a seat on the shuttle, since standing is prohibited. Understandably, local residents have priority over visitors. Only cash payments are accepted for the $25 round trip (as of Sep '22). The space beside the driver is often filled with packages, groceries and other supplies. With an intermediate stop at Shalalth, the trip lasts just over an hour each way.

The BBC described the picturesque journey beside the lake and through the tunnel as "Canada's greatest hidden rail trip".

Service farther west to D'Arcy is advertised as available by advance appointment.

References

Rail transport in British Columbia
Passenger railways in British Columbia
Lillooet Country
Railway services introduced in 2002